Zandera is a genus of annual plants in the family Asteraceae.

It is native to Mexico.

Species
There are 3 species accepted by Plants of the World Online;

The genus name of Zandera is in honour of Robert Zander (1892–1969), a German botanist and horticulturist in Berlin. 
It was first described and published in Haussknechtia, Mitt. Thüring. Bot. Ges. Vol.4 on page 32 in 1988.

It is noted as a possible synonym of Sigesbeckia  by the United States Department of Agriculture and the Agricultural Research Service, but they do not list any known species.

References

Asteraceae genera
Plants described in 1988
Flora of Mexico
Millerieae